Mexichromis aurora is a species of sea slug or dorid nudibranch, a marine gastropod mollusk in the family Chromodorididae.

Distribution 
The holotype of this species was collected at Seragaki Beach, ENE of Maekizaki, Ryukyu Islands, Okinawa, Japan at  depth. The distribution is entirely contained within the range of the more common Mexichromis trilineata and both species can be found at the same site.

Description
Originally described in the genus Pectenodoris this species is similar in anatomy and colouration to Mexichromis trilineata. Both of these species share a similar radula, anatomy and colour pattern which was considered sufficiently distinctive to define the genus Pectenodoris but this genus was merged with Mexichromis on the basis of a DNA phylogenetic study. The two species of Pectenodoris form a clade which is sister to the other Mexichromis species.

Ecology
Pectenodoris species feed on species of the sponge Dysidea.

References

External links
 

Chromodorididae
Gastropods described in 1998